The 1923 Penn Quakers football team was an American football team that represented the University of Pennsylvania as an independent during the 1923 college football season. In their first season under head coach Lou Young, the Quakers compiled a 5–4 record and outscored all opponents by a total of 95 to 63. The team played its home games at Franklin Field in Philadelphia.

Schedule

References

Penn
Penn Quakers football seasons
Penn Quakers football